''Haplochromis'' sp. 'black cryptodon' is a species of fish in the family Cichlidae. It is endemic to Tanzania.

References

Haplochromis
Fish of Tanzania
Endemic fauna of Tanzania
Undescribed vertebrate species
Taxonomy articles created by Polbot